Lake Avenue is a station on the abandoned North Shore Branch of the Staten Island Railway in Mariners Harbor, Staten Island, New York. It has two tracks and two side platforms.

History
The station opened in 1937 during a grade crossing elimination project. The station was abandoned on March 31, 1953, along with the South Beach Branch and the rest of the North Shore Branch.  It is one of the few stations along the North Shore line which still stands as of 2020, although in ruins.

References

 https://web.archive.org/web/20150108175705/http://stationreporter.net/nshore.htm

North Shore Branch stations
Railway stations in the United States opened in 1937
Railway stations closed in 1953
1937 establishments in New York City
1953 disestablishments in New York (state)